Therunde is a village in the Palghar district of Maharashtra, India. It is located in the Vikramgad taluka.

Demographics 

According to the 2011 census of India, Therunde has 178 households. The effective literacy rate (i.e. the literacy rate of population excluding children aged 6 and below) is 67.02%.

References 

Villages in Vikramgad taluka